Mason Mitchell (born June 25, 1994) is an American professional stock car racing driver and team owner. He competed in the ARCA Racing Series as an owner/driver, driving the No. 98 for Mason Mitchell Motorsports. He is the 2014 ARCA Racing Series champion.

Racing career

Mitchell started racing when he was five, riding dirt bikes. Three years later, he switched to cars, competing in the Central States Region Supercups and other series Minicup Series at age ten, winning the Midwest championship; he won 75 career Minicup races, and when he was 11, won the Jamaica Raceway track championship. When he was 13, he started racing late models, and joined the American Speed Association's Challenge Series National Tour two years later.

In 2012, Mitchell made his ARCA Racing Series debut for Eddie Sharp Racing at home track Iowa Speedway; after starting ninth, he finished tenth. The following year, Mitchell attempted the full season; despite missing a race and racing for four different team owners, he recorded 20 top tens, two poles and finished seventh in points.

In 2015, Mitchell debuted in the K&N Pro Series East Bowman Gray Stadium, driving the No. 1 Toyota for Hattori Racing Enterprises; after qualifying 16th, he finished eighth.

Mason Mitchell Motorsports
In late 2013, he formed Mason Mitchell Motorsports (MMM), hiring NASCAR crew chief Brad Parrott to serve the same role with Mitchell. The team began competing full-time in 2014. During the year, he recorded a win at Chicagoland Speedway, along with 12 top fives 18 top tens, five poles and an average finish of 5.8. He claimed the points lead after eight races and held on to win the series championship with a 255-point margin over runner-up Grant Enfinger. Mitchell became the first Iowa native to win an ARCA title in 40 years, the third-youngest champion in series history and the third owner/driver to win the championship. Mitchell also won the Fast Track Award, S&S Volvo Laps Completed, Hoosier Speedway Challenge, R.E. Lightning Challenge and the Menards Pole Award.

After the 2014 ARCA season had ended, Mitchell made his Camping World Truck Series debut with MMM in the Ford EcoBoost 200 at Homestead-Miami Speedway. Mitchell finished the race in 16th.

In 2015, defending ARCA Rookie of the Year Austin Wayne Self and Ryan London, crew chief of Enfinger, joined MMM, and Mitchell scaled back his schedule, driving part-time. During the season, Mitchell drove the No. 78, and scored a hometown victory at Iowa in July. He also competed for Venturini Motorsports' No. 55 Toyota at Berlin Raceway, finishing second. Later in the year, the team also fielded the No. 88 for Truck Series driver John Wes Townley at Kansas Speedway. At the same race, Mitchell recorded his third career win.

In 2016, MMM driver Gus Dean won his first career ARCA race at Talladega Superspeedway in the No. 98 GREE Cooling Products Chevrolet after beating Josh Williams to the line. Dean would later compete in select events with MMM before moving to Win-Tron Racing in 2017 with the GREE sponsorship.

The team ceased operations from their Mooresville, North Carolina shop on July 30, 2018 and their assets were purchased by Empire Racing.

Motorsports career results

NASCAR
(key) (Bold – Pole position awarded by qualifying time. Italics – Pole position earned by points standings or practice time. * – Most laps led.)

Camping World Truck Series

ARCA Racing Series
(key) (Bold – Pole position awarded by qualifying time. Italics – Pole position earned by points standings or practice time. * – Most laps led.)

 Season still in progress
 Ineligible for series points

References

External links
 
 
 

Living people
1994 births
Racing drivers from Des Moines, Iowa
Racing drivers from Iowa
NASCAR drivers
ARCA Menards Series drivers
People from West Des Moines, Iowa
ARCA Midwest Tour drivers